Tanner is a mainly masculine given name meaning "leather maker." 

It may refer to:
Tanner Cohen, American stage, film and television actor and singer
Tanner Conner (born 1998), American football player
Tanner Foust (born 1973), American professional racing driver, stunt driver and television host
Tanner Glass (born 1983), Canadian professional ice hockey player
Tanner Hall (skier) (born 1983), American freeskier
Tanner Houck (born 1996), American professional baseball player
Tanner Hudson (born 1994), American football player
Tanner Jeannot (born 1997), Canadian ice hockey player
Tanner Lee (born 1995), American football player
Tanner Maguire (born 1998), American child actor
Tanner Mangum (born 1993), American football player
Tanner Mordecai (born 2000), American football player
Tanner Morgan (born 1999), American football player
Tanner Muse (born 1996), American football player
Tanner Owen (born 1996), American football player
Tanner Patrick, (born 1991), an American singer
Tanner Pearson (born 1992), Canadian ice hockey player
Tanner Petulla (born 1993), American DJ
Tanner Purdum (born 1984), American football player
Tanner Rainey (born 1992), American professional baseball player
Tanner Richie (born 1993), American actor and singer
Tanner Roark (born 1986), American professional baseball player
Tanner Scheppers (born 1987), American professional baseball player
Tanner Smith (1887–1919), American criminal and gang leader in New York City
Tanner Smith (basketball player) (born 1990), American professional basketball player
Tanner Sparks (born 1988), American rock musician
Tanner Stransky, American journalist and television critic for Entertainment Weekly
Tanner Vallejo (born 1994), American football player
Tanner Varner (born 1984), American football player
Tanner Vili (born 1976), Samoan rugby union football player
Tanner Wayne (born 1988), American drummer
 Tanner (1929-1952), the first MGM Studio lion to be filmed in three-strip Technicolor, used from 1934 to 1956 and on MGM cartoons from 1963 to 1967. 
Tanner Boyle from The Bad News Bears

See also
Tanner (disambiguation)

English masculine given names